Enschede de Eschmarke is a railway station in eastern Enschede, Netherlands. The station opened on 18 November 2001 and is on the Zutphen–Glanerbeek railway. The connection to Gronau was reopened in 2001. The station is operated by Deutsche Bahn.

According to the 2005 RailPro survey in the Netherlands, this station is the least used station in the Netherlands, with an average of just 57 passengers per day.

Train services

Bus services

There is no bus service at this station. The nearest bus stop is Dolphia, 500m south of the station (in the Gronausestraat).

Gallery

External links
NS website 
Dutch Public Transport journey planner 

Railway stations in Overijssel
Railway stations opened in 2001
Railway stations on the Staatslijn D
Buildings and structures in Enschede